Point Peter is an unincorporated community in Searcy County, Arkansas, United States.

A post office was established at Point Peter in the 1840s.

References

Unincorporated communities in Searcy County, Arkansas
Unincorporated communities in Arkansas